A yiji was a high-class courtesan in ancient China.

Yiji were initially not involved in the direct sex trade, but rather were  entertainers who performed music and arts, such as poetry, music and singing, to please dignitaries and intellectuals. They were respected and renowned for their art and education in the classics, and were hired to perform to both male and female clients, as well as employed by the state. Though yiji could in individual cases choose to sell sexual favors to a client, this was not a part of her profession as a yiji, but a parallel favor outside of their profession as a yiji and regarded as separated from it.

After the establishment of the Qing dynasty in 1644, however, the Yiji were banned from being employed by the state. This made them dependent of the patronage of private clients, which resulted in the development of the profession to prostitution, as male clients started to demand sexual favors in exchange for patronage.

A yiji could come from various backgrounds, but a common background was that of a slave girl in a brothel: the girl was then taken from the brothel and educated in the arts of being a courtesan. The yiji could earn substantial fortunes, however, they were often caught in debt to former associates and, as they lacked families, were often exposed to ruinous lawsuits. When the yiji retired, she often educated her own daughter to be her successor, or selected a student to be so.

See also
 Geisha and Oiran in Japan 
 Sing-song girls
 Tawaif, similar profession during colonial India

References

 Yiji
Courtesans of antiquity
Obsolete occupations
Courtesans by type

zh:藝妓 (泛稱)